Nibong LRT station is an elevated Light Rail Transit (LRT) station on the Punggol LRT line West Loop in Punggol, Singapore, located along Punggol Way near the junction of Sumang Link. The station is located near Punggol Cove Primary School and Punggol Waterway Park.

Etymology
The name is derived from nibong (a Malay feather palm) poles and stilts that marked the beginnings of Punggol as a small Malay fishing village.

History

On 18 June 2014, SBS Transit announced that Nibong, Sumang and Soo Teck will be the first stations to open in the Punggol LRT line West Loop. The station opened on 29th of that month at 11.15 am.

References

Railway stations in Singapore opened in 2014
Punggol
LRT stations in Punggol
Railway stations in Punggol
Light Rail Transit (Singapore) stations